The name Mindulle has been used to name four tropical cyclones in the northwestern Pacific Ocean. The name was submitted by North Korea and refers to the Korean dandelion (Taraxacum platycarpum).

Typhoon Mindulle (2004) (T0407, 10W, Igme) – struck the Philippines, Taiwan and China.
Tropical Storm Mindulle (2010) (T1005, 06W)
Typhoon Mindulle (2016) (T1609, 10W) - affected much of Japan during August 2016.
Typhoon Mindulle (2021) (T2116, 20W) - reached category 5 super typhoon status and affected eastern Japan.

Pacific typhoon set index articles